Club Atlético Adelante Reconquista is an Argentine sports club from Reconquista, Santa Fe. Its football team currently plays in the Torneo Argentino B, the regionalised fourth division of the Argentine football league system.

Adelante was founded in 1919 as a football club, but the institution has expanded into several different sports, including basketball, tennis, rugby union, figure skating, tabletennis, paddle, volleyball, chess and martial arts. The club has many female teams and youth academies.

The club's basketball team plays in the Torneo Nacional de Ascenso (TNA), the second division of the Argentine league system.

Players

References

External links
Official website

 
A
A
A
Basketball teams established in 1919
A